Paas (trademarked as PAAS) is an American brand of Easter egg dye that is owned by Signature Brands, LLC.

History
The original Paas Easter egg dye was invented by American William Townley, the owner of a drug store in Newark, New Jersey, where he concocted recipes for home products. In 1893, he figured out how to concentrate dye in tablet form and launched the modern Easter egg dyeing kit. The original price of each tablet was five cents, and customers would make the dye by combining the tablets with water and vinegar. Townley eventually renamed his business the Paas Dye Company. "Paas" comes from Pasen, Dutch for Easter.

In 1901, according to a State of New Jersey inspection report, seven men and twenty women were employed in Townley's production facility at 60 Shipman Street in Newark. Paas eventually became the largest manufacturer of Easter egg dyes, and Philip B. Townley succeeded his father as head of the company.

Products
 Traditional - with 5 dye tablets to mix with vinegar and water
 Beaded
 Hologram
 Crack & Color
 Stencil
 Zoo Fun
 CAMO
 Sports Fanatic
 Egg Scribblers
 Egg Heads
 Sparkling Glitter
 Speckled Eggs
 Tie Dye
 Eggs-A-Glow
 Tattoos
 Egg Splash
 EggArounds
 EGGspress Yourself
 Color Cups
 Grip 'n' Dip	
 Color Snaps
 Active Volcanoes

Popular culture references
Comedian Patton Oswalt does a routine about the traditional dye kit.
The Paas dye kit is prominently displayed in an episode entitled "Fantastic Easter Special" of South Park. The Marsh family are coloring eggs with a Paas dye kit, and Stan begins asking his father why people color eggs at Easter time.
An animated Easter special Peter and the Magic Egg (1983) starring the voice of Ray Bolger was created as a tie-in to the product. Since its release, the four main animals from said special: Feathers the Duck, Cotton the Rabbit, Terrance the Turtle, and Lollichop Lamb would serve as the mascots for the product for years to come. In recent days, only the former two continued to serve as the mascots, while the latter two were eventually dropped.
NBC television show 30 Rock (in season 7, episode 1, "The Beginning of the End") mentions the egg dyeing company as owning the market, asking "when was the last time you bought a non-PAAS egg dye kit?"

References

External links
Paas Official Website
Dyeing wool yarn with Paas

1893 establishments in New Jersey
Easter egg
History of Newark, New Jersey
Manufacturing companies based in Newark, New Jersey